Nigel William Thomas Barber (born November 7, 1955, in Tullamore, Ireland) is an Irish-born American biopsychologist and author.

Biography
Barber emigrated from his native Ireland to the United States in 1982. He received his Ph.D. in biopsychology from the City University of New York in 1989, after which he taught at Bemidji State University as an instructor for one year, and then at Birmingham-Southern College as an assistant professor.

Books 
(2022). The Restless Species: Causes and Environmental Costs of Human Adaptive Success  
 (2022). The Human Beast Volume III...Restless People on a Troubled Planet. 
 (2021). The Human Beast Volume II...Evolution and the Modern World. 
 (2021). The Human Beast Volume I...Through the Lens of Evolution. 
 (2020). Evolution in the Here and Now.  Prometheus Books. 
 (2012). Why Atheism Will Replace Religion. Kindle (ebook) 
 (2008). The Myth of Culture. Cambridge Scholars Publishing. 
 (2004). Kindness in a Cruel World. Prometheus Books. 
 (2002). The Science of Romance: Secrets of the Sexual Brain. 
 (2002). Encyclopedia of Ethics in Science and technology. Facts on File, Inc. 
 (2000). Why Parents Matter: Parental Investment and Child Outcomes. Bergin & Garvey 
 (1998). Parenting: Roles, Styles and Outcomes. Nova Science Publisher, Inc.

Selected publications
 Barber, N. (1991). Play and Energy Regulation in Mammals. The Quarterly Review of Biology, 66(2), 129–147. 
 Barber, N. (1995). The evolutionary psychology of physical attractiveness. Ethology and Sociobiology, 16, 395–424. 
 Barber, N. (1998). The role of reproductive strategies in academic attainment. Sex Roles, 38, 313–323. 
 Barber N. (1998). Secular changes in standards of bodily attractiveness in women: tests of a reproductive model. The International journal of eating disorders, 23(4), 449–453. 
 Barber, N. (1998). Ecological and Psychosocial Correlates of Male Homosexuality. Journal of Cross-Cultural Psychology, 29(3), 387–401. https://www.deepdyve.com/lp/sage/ecological-and-psychosocial-correlates-of-male-homosexuality-gg0LYh9ZAl?key=sage
 Barber. (1998). Sex differences in disposition towards kin, security of adult attachment, and sociosexuality as a function of parental divorce. Evolution and Human Behavior., 19(2), 125–132. 
 Barber, N. (1999). Women's dress fashions as a function of reproductive strategy. Sex Roles, 40(5-6), 459–471. 
 Barber, N. (2000). The sex ratio as a predictor of cross-national variation in violent crime. Cross-Cultural Research, 34(3), 264–282. 
 Barber, N. (2001). Mustache Fashion Covaries with a Good Marriage Market for Women. Journal of Nonverbal Behavior, 25, 261–272. 
 Barber, N. (2003). Paternal investment prospects and cross-national differences in single parenthood. Cross-Cultural Research, 37(2), 163–177. 
 Barber, N. (2003). Divorce and reduced economic and emotional interdependence: A cross-national study. Journal of Divorce and Remarriage, 39, 113–124. 
 Barber, N. (2004). Single Parenthood as a Predictor of Cross-National Variation in Violent Crime. Cross-Cultural Research, 38(4), 343–358. 
 Barber, Nigel. (2005). Evolutionary Explanations for Societal Differences in Single Parenthood. Evolutionary Psychology. 3. 
 Barber, N. (2005). Educational and ecological correlates of IQ: A cross-national investigation. Intelligence, 33(3), 273–284. 
 Barber, N. (2006). Why is violent crime so common in the Americas?. Aggressive Behavior, 32(5), 442–450.  
 Barber, N. (2006). Is the Effect of National Wealth on Academic Achievement Mediated by Mass Media and Computers? Cross-Cultural Research, 40(2), 130–151. 
 Barber, N. (2007). Evolutionary Explanations for Societal Differences and Historical Change in Violent Crime and Single Parenthood. Cross-Cultural Research, 41(2), 123–148. 
 Barber, N. (2008). Explaining Cross-National Differences in Polygyny Intensity: Resource-Defense, Sex Ratio, and Infectious Diseases. Cross-Cultural Research, 42(2), 103–117. 
 Barber, N. (2008). Cross-National Variation in the Motivation for Uncommitted Sex: The Role of Disease and Social Risks. Evolutionary Psychology. 
 Barber, N. (2009). Countries with fewer males have more violent crime: marriage markets and mating aggression. Aggressive behavior, 35(1), 49–56. 
 Barber, N. (2010). Explaining cross-national differences in fertility: A comparative approach to the demographic shift. Cross-Cultural Research, 44, 3-22.
 Barber, N. (2015). Why behavior matches ecology: Adaptive variation as a novel solution. Cross-Cultural Research, 49(1), 57–89. 
 Barber, N. (2017). Creative productivity and marriage markets: Mating effort and career striving as rival hypotheses. Journal of Genius and Eminence, 2, 32–44. 
 Barber, N. (2018). Cross-national variation in attitudes to premarital sex: Economic development, disease risk, and marriage strength. Cross-Cultural Research, 52, 259–273.

Research
Barber's research focuses on various subjects in the fields of biopsychology and evolutionary psychology. These include the evolution of altruism, the reasons that men grow facial hair, and the reasons that people believe in religion, which he believes pertain to economic adversity.

References

External links
Personal page at Psychology Today

1955 births
Living people
Irish emigrants to the United States
21st-century American psychologists
Evolutionary psychologists
Bemidji State University faculty
Birmingham–Southern College faculty
City University of New York alumni
People from Tullamore, County Offaly
20th-century American psychologists